Swapan Kumar Gayen is a Bengali-American physicist.  He is a professor of physics at the City University of New York.

Education and career 

Gayen was born in a Bengali family in Dhaka, Bangladesh.  He completed his BSc (Hons) and MSc in physics from the University of Dhaka in 1977. In 1984, he received his PhD in physics from the University of Connecticut.  His thesis was titled Two-photon absorption spectroscopy of the trivalent cerium ion in calcium fluoride.

After finishing his PhD, Gayen became a research associate at the City University of New York from 1984 until 1988.  He then moved to the Stevens Institute of Technology as an assistant professor, where he remained until 1995.  In 1995, he returned to CUNY, where he was promoted through the ranks, reaching the title of full professor of physics in 2007.  He served as chair of the CUNY department of physics from 2016 until 2019.

Gayen is a member of the American Physical Society, the Optical Society of America, as well as the New York Academy of Sciences. As an academic, his primary research interests include photonics and optical spectroscopy.

References

External links 
 
 

Bengali physicists
University of Dhaka alumni
University of Connecticut alumni
Stevens Institute of Technology faculty
City University of New York faculty
Living people
Year of birth missing (living people)
American people of Indian descent
Indian scholars